Preset may refer to:

 Default (computer science), a setting or value automatically assigned to a software application, computer program, etc.
 Preset (electronics), a variable component on a device only accessible to manufacturing or maintenance personnel
 Pre-programmed setting on various electronic products and musical instruments, including:
 Combination action on pipe organ
 Preset button (tuner) - station selectors on the tuner of radio receiver and television set
 Preset key (Hammond organ) - inverse color keys on Hammond organs, to recall pre-programmed tonewheel settings
 Preset rhythm - pre-programmed rhythm-pattern on drum machine
 Synthesizer patch stored a pre-programmed tone

Mathematics
 Pre-ordered set
 A set without an equivalence relation; see 
Music
 The Presets - a Sydney-based Australian duo, consisting of Julian Hamilton and Kim Moyes
Schools
 Preset Pacesetters Institute, a private boarding Senior High school in Madina, Ghana